Dayton History is an organization located in Dayton, Ohio, USA, formed in 2005 by the merger of the  Montgomery County Historical Society (originally the Dayton Historical Society) and Dayton's Carillon Historical Park.

References

Historical societies in Ohio
Organizations based in Dayton, Ohio